Samuel Atta Akyea (born 20 August 1962) is a Ghanaian lawyer and politician. A member of the New Patriotic Party of Ghana, he served as the Minister for Works and Housing until January 2021, and the current Member of Parliament of Akim Abuakwa South constituency. He is only the second person apart from President Nana Akufo-Addo to have been elected as MP of that constituency in the 4th republic.

Early life and education 
He was born in Kyebi in the Eastern Region of Ghana. He attended the University of Ghana, Legon and graduated with a Bachelor of Arts degree in Law and Philosophy in 1989. He proceeded to the Ghana School of Law and obtained his practising license in 1993.

Working life 
After graduating from law school he was employed as a state attorney at the Attorney General's Department. He later joined the private law firm, Akufo-Addo Prempeh & Co in Accra. In 1995, he joined another private law firm, Zoe Akyea & Co., where he was made a partner and worked there for fourteen years. He left private legal practice to contest the 2008 Abuakwa South constituency election.

Political life 
Atta Akyea entered politics in 2008 when he was elected the parliamentarian for the Abuakwa South constituency. He competed against two other aspirants, namely, Sammy Osei of the National Democratic Congress and Nana Addo Aikins, an Independent candidate. He won the election by obtaining 22,681 votes out of the 30,109 which represented 75.3% of valid votes cast. He succeeded Nana Addo Dankwa Akufo-Addo, who stepped down as MP in order to concentrate on his presidential ambitions. Atta Akyea went on to retain his seat in the two subsequent elections held in 2012 and 2016. In parliament, he has served on various committees including the Finance, Public Accounts Judiciary and Appointments Committees of Parliament.

2016 election 
In the 2016 Ghanaian general election, he won the Abuakwa South Constituency parliamentary seat with 28,442 votes making 78.7.61% of the total votes cast whilst the NDC parliamentary candidate Owuraku Amofah had 7,697 votes making 21.3% of the total votes cast.

2020 election 
In the 2020 Ghanaian general election, he again won the Abuakwa South Constituency parliamentary seat with 29,897 votes making 75.7% of the total votes cast whilst the NDC parliamentary candidate Sanusi Mohammed had 7,740 votes making 19.6% of the total votes cast, the GUM parliamentary candidate Banning-Peprah Felix had 957 votes making 2.4% of the total votes cast and an Independent parliamentary candidate Marfo Enock Kwame had 905 votes making 2.3% of the total votes cast.

Galamsey fight 
Atta Akyea was accused of not doing enough to stop the use of the Birim River by galamseyers. The Birim river which passes through his constituency is a major river body in Ghana and supplies a substantial amount of the constituency's water requirement. Atta Akyea opined that the galamsey fight was a national problem requiring military support.

Committees 
In 2021, he was a member of the Appointment Committee.

Atta Akyea is the Chairperson of the Mines and Energy Committee, a member of the Subsidiary Legislation Committee and also a member of the Special Budget Committee.

Ministerial appointment 
In January 2017, President Akufo-Addo nominated him to be Works and Housing Minister as part of his second batch of minister designates. Prior to his vetting by the appointments committee of Parliament, it emerged that he had made almost no input relevant to the ministry he had been nominated to head in addition he had not been involved in any relevant interaction with the Works and Housing committee. It was however, a credit to him that his track record for building strong institutions and enforcement of constitutional provisions would bode well for him in the sector. During his vetting by the appointments committee on 31 January 2017, he expressed his vision for the ministry he had been appointed to and promised to complete all uncompleted housing projects started by the John Dramani Mahama administration. He told the committee that he would prioritise the construction of houses for members of the judiciary.
He was sworn in along with eleven other ministers by President Akufo-Addo on 8 February 2017 at the Jubilee House in Accra.

Personal life 
He is married with three children and is a Christian. He is a member of the International Central Gospel Church.

Award 
Atta Akyea received the Nobles International Award from the West African Nobles Forum.

Controversy 
In March 2022, he was chased out by the people in the Abuakwa South Constituency. It was alleged he failed to honor his campaign promises to the people.

Philanthropy 
In March 2020, he presented some sanitary products to his constituency in the fight against COVID-19 pandemic.

References 

1962 births
Living people
People from Eastern Region (Ghana)
New Patriotic Party politicians
Ghanaian MPs 2009–2013
Ghanaian MPs 2013–2017
Ghanaian MPs 2017–2021
University of Ghana alumni
Ghana School of Law alumni
20th-century Ghanaian lawyers
Ghanaian Christians
Government ministers of Ghana
Ghanaian MPs 2021–2025
21st-century Ghanaian lawyers